The Traffic Policeman  is a 1960 Italian comedy film directed by Luigi Zampa and starring Alberto Sordi in the lead role. A representative of the commedia all'italiana genre, it tells the story of a traffic policeman and the injustice he endures for daring to enforce the law at the expense of people in power.

Plot
Otello Celletti is a war veteran from a small town in Latium. He has been unemployed since the end of the war and lives with his father, wife Amalia and their son, at the expense of his brother-in-law. When he is offered a menial job in the town's markets, Otello refuses in disdain. After fiercely insisting with the town's Mayor and by leveraging his veteran status, Otello eventually obtains a position with the local traffic police. Though he performs his duties poorly, Otello still abuses his authority to exact petty revenge upon those who had been teasing him while he was jobless.

One day, Otello finds himself offering roadside assistance to famous actress Sylva Koscina. He indulges in pleasantries with the actress, inviting her for coffee and opting not to fine her for missing her driving license and car documents. That night, during a guest appearance on the television program Il Musichiere in front of 18 million viewers, Sylva publicly greets Otello but, at the insistence of host Mario Riva, also reveals how Otello let her go when he should have fined or even arrested her.

Following the incident and under political pressure, the Mayor berates Otello for tarnishing the public image of the police force, threatening to fire him. Some time later, Otello catches the Mayor himself speeding on a dangerous curve. Believing his integrity is being tested, Otello chases the Mayor on his way to meet his mistress, eventually issuing a speeding ticket, which involuntarily exposes the Mayor's extramarital affair. Angered, the Mayor suspends Otello and appeals the fine.

Otello decries his treatment with the local monarchists, who choose him as their candidate at the upcoming mayoral election opposite the current Mayor. In a private meeting with the Mayor's party members, an invigorated Otello threatens to expose knowledge of years of mismanagement by the Mayor's administration. In response, the Mayor produces evidence of compromising information about Otello and his family: Otello's sister, who was thought to be a masseuse in Milan, is instead a prostitute; Otello himself is not legally married to Amalia, as her legal husband in pre-divorce Italy still lives; and Otello's father, whom he believed a Great War hero, had instead served time for accidentally shooting King Victor Emmanuel III, a fact that if known would alienate the monarchists.

At the next day's appeal hearing, Otello relents and exonerates the Mayor, pretending he unduly fined him out of a faulty odometer reading and also withdrawing his candidacy. Some time after being reinstated as a traffic policeman, Otello is shown making way for the Mayor as he speeds once again along the same curve, only for the Mayor to crash his car and be hospitalized, thus serving poetic justice to Otello.

Cast
 Alberto Sordi - Otello Celletti
 Vittorio De Sica - The Mayor
 Marisa Merlini - Amalia Celletti
 Sylva Koscina - herself
 Mario Riva - himself
 Mara Berni - Mayor's lover
 Nando Bruno - Celletti's brother-in-law
 Riccardo Garrone - Police lieutenant
 Lia Zoppelli - Mayor's Wife
 Franco Di Trocchio - Celletti's son
 Carlo Pisacane - Celletti's father

External links 
 

1960 films
Films set in Italy
Films shot in Lazio
1960s Italian-language films
1960 comedy films
Commedia all'italiana
Italian black-and-white films
Films directed by Luigi Zampa
Films scored by Piero Umiliani
1960s Italian films